Gjirokastra Stadium is a multi-use stadium in Gjirokastër, Albania.  It is used mostly for football matches and is the home ground of KS Luftëtari Gjirokastër. The stadium has a capacity of 8,400 people. This is the first time after 1972 that the stadium is renovated in so big level.

Renovation
Following Luftëtari's promotion back to the Albanian Superliga in 2016, the stadium required a complete renovation in order to meet the necessary requirements to host home games in the top flight. Work on the stadium began in August 2016 and the surface was to be replaced and plastic seats were to be installed throughout the stadium. The first stage of the reconstruction was completed in November 2016, which meant that the stadium was able to host Albanian Superliga games once again. The first stage consisted of replacing the playing surface, the installation of 300 plastic seats in the main stand, the installation of CCTV as well as the refurbishment of the changing room for both players and officials. The cost of the work carried out totalled 15,000,000 Albanian lek, around €110,000 at the time, and it was a joint investment by the Municipality of Gjirokastër, the Albanian Football Association as well as the club's owner Grigor Tavo. The first game of the 2016–17 season to take place at the stadium came against Partizani which ended 1–1 with around 3,000 fans in attendance.

References

Luftëtari Gjirokastër
Football venues in Albania
Multi-purpose stadiums in Albania
Buildings and structures in Gjirokastër